Carlos Manuel Almeida Almeida (born 6 December 1987), nicknamed Calico is a Portuguese football defender who plays for Lusitano FCV. He played on the Portuguese second tier for União Madeira.

References

1987 births
Living people
Portuguese footballers
Académico de Viseu F.C. players
C.F. União players
Lusitano FCV players
Association football midfielders
Liga Portugal 2 players
People from Mangualde
Sportspeople from Viseu District